Education in Vietnam is a state-run system of public and private education run by the Ministry of Education and Training. It is divided into five levels: preschool, primary school, secondary school, high school, and higher education. Formal education consists of twelve years of basic education. Basic education consists of five years of primary education, four years of secondary education, and three years of high school education. The majority of basic education students are enrolled on a daily  basis. The main goals are general knowledge improvement, human resources training and talent development.

Vietnam has undergone major political upheaval and social inequality throughout its recent history and is attempting to modernise. Historically, education in Vietnam followed the Chinese Confucian model, using Chữ Hán (for the Vietnamese language and for Chinese) as the main mode of literature and governance. This system promoted those who were talented enough to be mandarins or royal courtiers in Vietnam and China. This system was then completely overhauled and replaced by a French model system during French colonial times, which has since been replaced and overhauled again during the formation of independent Vietnam and the creation of Chữ Quốc Ngữ alphabet in the 1920s.

Vietnam is known for its curriculum that is deemed highly competitive. High school education is one of the most significant social issues in the country: designated schools known as "High Schools for the Gifted" (Trường Trung học phổ thông chuyên) offer additional extensive courses, are generally regarded as prestigious, and demand high entrance examination test scores. Higher education is seen as fundamental in Vietnam. Entrance to university is determined through the National High School Graduation Examination (NHSGE) test. The higher the entrance test score, the more highly regarded the institution will be.

Currently experiencing a high GDP growth rate, Vietnam is attempting to expand its education system. In 2012, estimated national budget for education was 6.3%. In the last decade, Vietnamese public reception of the country's education system has been mixed due to its inflexible nature and its tests. Citizens have been critical of the curriculum, which has led to social issues including depression, anxiety, and increasing suicide rates. There have been comments from the public that schools should opt for a more flexible studying program, with less emphasis on tests and more focus on developing life skills. In response to public opinion, the Ministry of Education and Training has implemented a number of education reforms. Tertiary enrollment rates were only 3% in 1995 but increased to around 30% by 2019. Regardless, more work is needed to be done to improve education at all levels, from pre-primary, to primary, to secondary, to post-secondary.

Establishments
Regarding ownership, as prescribed in Article 44 of Vietnam's Education Law, there are four types of educational establishments:
 Public education establishments: established and monitored by the State. The State also nominates their administrators and decides staff quota. The State invests in infrastructure and allocates funding for their regular spending tasks.
 Semi-public educational establishments: set up by the State on the basis of mobilizing organizations and individuals in the society to jointly invest in infrastructure.
 People-founded educational establishments: Social or economic organizations apply for permission from the State to set up an institution with non-State budget capital.
 Private educational establishments: Individuals or groups of individuals apply for permission from the State to set up and invest in the institution by themselves.
The semi-public, people-founded and private educational establishments are referred collectively to as non-public educational establishments.

School grades
In Vietnam, a school year is divided into two semesters: the first begins in mid or late in August and lasts until the end of December, while the second begins right after the first, which is about mid- January and ends in May.

Academic grading

Preschool
Public kindergartens usually admit children ranging from 18 months to 5 years of age. Sometimes, four- or five-year-old children are taught the alphabet and basic arithmetic. This level of education is not compulsory but tends to be popular in cities such as Hanoi, Ho Chi Minh City, Da Nang, Hai Phong, Can Tho and Vung Tau.

Primary

Children normally start primary education (tiểu học) at the age of six. Education at this level lasts for 5 years and is compulsory for all children. The country's literacy rate is over 90%.

According to the Multiple Indicators Cluster Survey 2006 of Vietnam's General Statistics Office, 96% of six to 11-year-old children enrolled in primary school. There was still a disparity in the primary education completion rate among different ethnicity groups. While primary completion rate for Kinh students was 86%, the rate for ethnic minority children was only 61%.

In the school year 2009–2010, Vietnam had 15,172 primary schools and 611 combined primary and lower secondary schools. The total enrollment was 7.02 million pupils, of whom 46% were girls.

The renovated primary education curriculum in Vietnam is divided into two phases as follows:

 Phase 1 includes Grades 1, 2 and 3 with 9 subjects: Vietnamese Language, Mathematics, Morality, Nature and Society, Arts, Physical Education, and (since 2020) Experience Activities, Information Technology and Foreign Language.
 Phase 2 includes Grades 4 and 5 with 12 subjects: Vietnamese Language, Information Technology, Mathematics, Morality, Science (Nature and Society), History, Geography, Basic Techniques, Music, Arts, Physical Education and (since 2023) Experience Activities and Foreign Language.

Secondary 
Secondary education consists of lower secondary education or junior high school  followed by high school or upper secondary high school.

Lower

Lower secondary school or Junior high school includes sixth, seventh, eighth and ninth grade. Until its abolition in 2006, students had to pass the Intermediate Graduation Examination (IGE) presented by the local Department of Education and Training to graduate. The IGE comprises Math, Literature, and Foreign Language tests. This educational level is homogeneous throughout most of the country, except in very remote provinces, which expect to popularize and standardize middle education within the next few years. Intermediate education is not compulsory in Vietnam.

The Lower Secondary Education's weekly schedule includes the following subjects and activities: Vietnamese Language (Literature), Mathematics, Biology, Physics, Chemistry, History, Geography, Civics, foreign language (often English or French), Physical Education, Technology, Art, Music, Optional Subjects, Class Activities and School Activities, Vocational-oriented activities (3 periods per month in Grade 8 or in some cases, the summer between 7th and 8th Grade) and Extra-curricular activities (4 periods per month in all grades). Ιn the end of year 8, student will participate in secondary vocational exam to earn extra-mark for the 10th grade examination.

The Technology subject aims to show the link between theory and practice. It includes four parts: home economics (in Grade 6), agriculture-forestry and aquaculture (in Grade 7), Industry (in Grade 8) and optional modules (in Grade 9).

Middle school 
All subjects are compulsory for students.
Literature: mostly Vietnamese literature, occasionally combined with foreign literature including Chinese, French, American and Russian
Mathematics
 Years 6: two separate subjects – Arithmetic and Geometry
 Years 7–10: two separate subjects – Algebra and Geometry
 Year 11: three separate subjects – Algebra, Calculus and Geometry
 Year 12: two separate subjects – Calculus, and Geometry
Natural Science (Year 6–9, from 2021)
Physics (from year 10 onward since 2024)
Chemistry (from year 8 onward until 2023; year 10 onward starting 2024)
Biology (from year 10 onward since 2024)
History and Geography (Year 6–9, from 2021)
History (from year 10 onward starting 2024)
Geography (from year 10 onward starting 2024)
Civics: generally consists of economics, philosophy (Marxism-Leninism), politics, jurisprudence and ethics
Foreign language: English is the predominant foreign language; French, Mandarin, Russian, Japanese, German and Korean are taught at some specialized schools
Technology (Vocational Training): consists of Agriculture/Horticulture, Mechanics, Electronics, Design, etc.
Informatics: recently introduced, yet to be implemented in poorer regions. Students study basic programming in languages such as Pascal, C/C++ and Python (from 2020)
Physical Education (P.E)
National Defense and Security Training (since year 10)
Music and Arts (until the first half of year 9 until 2022, after which Music and Arts has been introduced from year 10 onward since)

Advanced classes consists of either:
Natural sciences: Students follow an advanced curriculum (and different textbooks) in mathematics, physics, chemistry and biology
Social sciences: Students follow an advanced curriculum (and different textbooks) in literature, history, geography and foreign language

At the start of secondary school, students can enroll in Specialist Classes if they pass the class entrance exam, which usually consists of a Mathematics exam, a Literature exam, a Foreign Language exam and an exam of the subject that the student wants to specialize in. The specialised subject can be any of the subjects listed above, except Technology, Physical Education, Civics and Music/Arts. If the specialised subjects Students enrolled in these programs have a heavier workload than regular secondary school students. The workload varies from school to school, but grade 11 students are generally expected to study grade 12 courses concurrently. Other courses include university-level courses. Some schools go as far as requiring their students to finish secondary school by the end of grade 10.

Only prestigious schools offer these unstandardized classes.

High school

High school or upper secondary school education consists of grades ten to twelve. There is often an entrance examination for high schooling. The score determines the schools at which students are able to enroll. The higher the score, the more prestigious the school.

Graduation exam
All high school students in Vietnam are required to take a high school graduation exam (Kỳ thi Tốt nghiệp Trung học phổ thông), which is administered by the Ministry of Education and Training, at the end of grade 12 to get a diploma called the Graduation Diploma of General Upper Secondary Education (Bằng tốt nghiệp Trung học phổ thông). They still have to take the regular end-of-term examinations before taking the National High School Exam.

The Ministry of Education and Training announced that for the graduation examination of 2017, five papers would be included: Mathematics, Literature, Foreign language, Natural Sciences, and Social Sciences. Three papers are mandatory for all students: Mathematics, Literature (the only remaining essay-based exam paper which is the spiritual successor of 1075-1919 exams), and Foreign language. Foreign language exam can be one of the following: English, French, German, Chinese, Japanese, Russian or Korean (since 2021). Apart from three mandatory papers, student must complete a fourth paper by choosing either natural sciences (a combination of Physics, Chemistry, and Biology) or Social Sciences (a combination of History, Geography, and Civic Education). In some cases, before 2020, students can take both the Natural Sciences and Social Sciences and will choose the paper with the higher result to be evaluated.

University

University entrance is based on the scores achieved in the entrance examination (Tuyển sinh đại học và cao đẳng). High school graduates need high scores to be admitted to universities. Securing a place in a public university is considered a major step in a successful career, especially for rural or otherwise disadvanted people. The pressure on the candidates therefore remains very high, despite the measures taken to reduce the importance of these exams. The demand for student placements into universities outweighed the supply, where around 1.3 million students would choose to enroll into universities, but only 600,000 could be supplied due to lack of teaching staff at the tertiary level or post-secondary level. This prompted major calls for the government to help expand the tertiary sector, especially with increasing trend of enrolments into university since 1990 to 2019. Additionally, university admissions is highly competitive.

Normally, candidates take three exams for the fixed group of subjects they choose. There are many fixed groups of subjects, the main ones being:

Group A: Mathematics, Physics, Chemistry
Group A1: Mathematics, Physics, English
Group B: Mathematics, Biology, Chemistry
Group C: Literature, History, Geography
Group D: Literature, Foreign Language, Mathematics

Group D consists of six subgroups based on the languages they provide in universities:
Group D1: entrance exam subject is English; major language in university is English, but students can also choose also Russian, French, Mandarin, German, Japanese, Korean, Arabic, Spanish, Portuguese, Italian or Thai.
Group D2: entrance exam subject is Russian; major language in university is Russian
Group D3: entrance exam subject is French; major language in university is French, students can choose Italian instead.
Group D4: entrance exam subject is Chinese; major language in university is Mandarin
Group D5: entrance exam subject is German; major language in university is German
Group D6: entrance exam subject is Japanese; major language in university is Japanese

Besides these, there are groups for artistic and cultural education:
Group H: Literature, Visual Art Talents
Group M: Literature, Mathematics, Singing and Expressive Reading, Instrument Performance (optional)
Group N: Literature, Tone and Melody, Vocal
Group R: Literature, History, Journalism
Group S: Literature, Theatrical Talents
Group T: Mathematics, Biology, Sports
Group V: Mathematics, Physics, Drawing

In 2007, Vietnam's Ministry of Education and Training started to use multiple choice exam format for several subjects during the university entrance examination. These subjects include Physics, Chemistry, Biology and Foreign Language. Each multiple choice exam lasts 90 minutes. The foreign language exam consists of 80 multiple choice questions; meanwhile, the Physics, Chemistry, Biology exam has 50 questions. Math, Literature, History and Geography exams use composition format.

Starting from the entrance exam of 2013, 10 artistic and cultural universities will remove Literature from the exam of the group H, N and S. Instead, the results of three years in high school and the scores of the HGE will be used to evaluate the candidates.

Starting from 2015, high school graduation and university entrance merged to one exam. Each student will take at least four subjects for the exam including three compulsory —  mathematics, literature and foreign language (mostly English) — and one sub-subject such as physics, chemistry, geography, biology, history. After the result has been given, the student can use their score to pass the high school graduation exam and to go to their desired college with three chosen points from the four given.

Types

Vietnamese Government decree (decree 43/2000/ND-CP, dated August 30, 2000) identified three types of higher education institutions:
 "Đại học" (university), which is a multidisciplinary institution offering fields of study and which has research capacities. Five major multidisciplinary universities in Vietnam are Vietnam National University, Hanoi; Vietnam National University, Ho Chi Minh City; Huế University; University of Da Nang; and Can Tho University.  
 "Trường Đại học" (senior college), which is more narrowly focused in its curriculum, sometimes on a single study area.
 "Học viện" (institute), which is also narrowly focused in terms of study area but which may have a specialized research capacity.

Other post-secondary forms of education also include junior college or community colleges, professional secondary schools, and vocational schools which offer degrees or certificates. Several universities offer college vocational degrees as well as shorter general and specific industry-tailored training courses.

In the school year 2010–2011, Vietnam had 163 universities (including senior colleges and institutes) and 223 junior colleges, in which 50 senior colleges and 30 junior colleges are non-public.

The presence of international universities are increasing. Universities such as PSB International College, RMIT, Eastern International University and University of Hawaii offer degrees in fields such as business, English as a Second Language and Information Technology. Running an international education system in Vietnam is challenging. Quality control and affordability are key issues, as well as red tape. Additionally, in the past, Viet Nam had followed a Soviet Union model where research and teaching institutes were separated instead of being together.

Qualifications
 Associate Degree: a three-year program delivered by junior colleges (including teachers colleges and others) and/or by some universities as additional training programs.
 Bachelor's degree: a four- to six-year program — six years for students studying medical and dental sciences; five years for students of industrial engineering; and four years for the majority of other undergraduate degrees such as Social Sciences. Graduates receive degrees with a title corresponding to their field of study such as bachelor (cử nhân), engineer (kỹ sư), medical doctor (bác sĩ), or lawyer (luật sư), etc.

Most of Vietnam's universities also offer master's (two years) and Doctor of Philosophy (four years) degrees.

Teaching quality issues
The higher education system has been criticised by Vietnam's diaspora, such as outdated curricula, a lecturer-centered method of teaching and learning, a lack of linkage between teaching and research activities, and a large discord between theory and practical training that leads to a large number of graduates being unable to find a job, while skills shortages drive inflation to double-digit levels. Vietnamese students perceive themselves to have a lack of knowledge despite being taught a lot due to the fact that the main purpose of studying was to pass exams or to achieve high test scores without real-life implementation. According to the survey on graduate employment in 2009-2010 conducted by Center for Policy Studies and Analysis- University of Social Sciences and Humanities, Vietnam National University, Hanoi,  among 3000 respondents, 26.2% were unemployed. Among those employed, 61% lacked sufficient working skill, 43% lacked experience, and 32% felt insecure in providing professional expertise.

Teaching methods delivered in the public system are mainly teacher-oriented. Class discussions are uncommon as students are expected to be studious and passively attentive in the classroom. This method may be a manifestation of Confucian culture and is in contrast to British and American pedagogy, where interaction and debate is prominent.

Advanced and specialized high school students are generally expected to study additional courses, which can amount to a total of nine periods a day. Parents also enroll their children into extensive tutoring sessions, which is not to be confused with cram schools, because the tutoring sessions are taken regardless of any upcoming tests or exams. The average monthly salary of local Vietnamese public teachers is between US$60 and US$100, so many supplement their income by moonlighting, working in the private sector or tutoring. Students who do not attend these sessions are always at a disadvantage, as materials appearing on tests and exams are often covered only in tutoring sessions.

Public schools are underfunded. Only primary schools are subsidized by the government, to 50% of the total tuition cost. Enrollment rates are high and primary education quality, particularly in poor areas, is below the required standard. Moreover, the drop-out rate after fifth grade is also high for those in rural and mountainous area since most students cannot afford to attend secondary school or university due to poverty. Participatory Poverty Assessments (PPAs) found that for many poor households, child labor is considered more valuable than school attendance in short-term economics. Regular school absenteeism also leads to poor academic performance. For poor families, the opportunity cost of sending their children to school is perceived to be high and the long-term benefit of education cannot outweigh the short-term economic losses. In response to these challenges, the Ministry of Education and Training has implemented a number of educational reforms from 2015 onward.

English as a second language
Private language centers offering English as a second language are in high demand in the larger cities of Hanoi and Ho Chi Minh City.

Stringent immigration/visa system is now being more strictly enforced (where previously the regulations were only enforced if visiting teachers fell foul of the criminal legal system). Now schools are routinely inspected for foreign teachers (ostensibly to ensure the tax codes are applied) and, as part of this process, degrees and teaching qualifications must be verified by the holder's embassy or relevant authority. Copies must be filed with immigration authorities. (Similar regulations for opening bank accounts and registration of residences of foreigners mean unqualified teachers remain but are often consigned to the "back-street" schools or may be susceptible to disreputable school owners and landlords. The penalties for abuse of these regulations are substantial with respect to rents or incomes of schools.)

The country has implemented OECD guidelines to the education sector with respect to English language skills of high school and university graduates. This means that for high school graduates to apply for university entry, overseas study (high school or university), or graduate from an undergraduate university course, individuals must achieve an internationally recognised and standardised test of English (IELTS, TOEIC, TOEFL, etc., or sometimes worryingly "an equivalent, designed, created and marked by local instructors, with scores/levels varying from course/degree/university/institution). This recent development has caused further changes in this sector, attracting further experienced IELTS trainers, retaining existing trainers and creating demands for teacher training from such agencies as British Council and IDP.

Limited job expectations 
During the 1990s, Vietnam reached a major increase in its economy–with annual GDP growth of 5 to 7 percent–as well as a rapid educational growth within the country. Ever since then, the net enrollment rates in Vietnam have increased at least 95 percent for primary and secondary schools.

Vietnam's education fails to catch up with the world's development, which affects the country negatively when compared with other countries in an aspect of employment. For quality, the current textbooks that are used for schools are reported to be too theoretical and abstract. . And for quantity, there have been reports saying students are overloaded with course work and school hours. Some people may opine that Vietnam needs a change in its system to provide students a better knowledgeable background: hand-on training should be offered to students rather than fixed training programs.   One of the world's poorest countries, it lacks funding to achieve this goal during the modernization process.

Since the 1998's implementation of higher education reform, the Vietnamese Higher Education (VHE)'s quality has been noticeably low and may not meet the threshold for the national workforce as companies claimed to not have yet found applicants that meet their expected requirements. In 2017, the quality score of the country's workforce alerted the government to put more effort in fixing the educational system in the country: 3.79 out of 10.

See also

 Vietnamese studies

Notes

References

Bibliography